Mighty Roosters RC is a Belgian rugby club in De Haan.

References

External links
 Mighty Roosters RC

Belgian rugby union clubs
Rugby clubs established in 2011
Sport in West Flanders
De Haan, Belgium